Favour Ugochi Anosike (born 6 March 1997) popularly known as Ugoccie, is a Nigerian singer, songwriter, rapper and voice over artiste. She is known for her hit single "Do You Really Like Me?" The song went viral on TikTok, which earned her the Rookie of the year nomination at The Headies 2022.

Early life 
Favour Ugochi Anosike was born on March 6, 1997. She hails from the Eastern part of Nigeria and of Igbo tribe to be precise.
She was raised alongside her siblings by her parents, she started singing from early, and finally entered the music scene at teen as an on-air-personality.

Career 
She went viral on social media after she ‘cover’  ‘One ticket’ song by Kizz Daniel who shared her freestyle on his platform alongside Tunde Ednut.

In 2021, she won the next rated at naijattrafic Awards.

In March 2022, she was nominated for Rookie Of The Year at The Headies 2022.

On April 22, 2022 she collaborated with  a Nigerian rapper, singer, songwriter and record producer Phyno on her song titled Breakfast.

In June 22, 2022 she was nominated at the NET Honours Class of 2022 awards.

Discography 

Do You Really Like Me
No Wahala
Obi Cubana
Hookup
Due Time
Close For The Day
Breakfast feat. Phyno

Awards and nominations

References

Living people
1997 births
Nigerian rhythm and blues singers
People from Abia State